Rupert Read (born 1966) is an academic and a Green Party campaigner and a former spokesperson for Extinction Rebellion. Read is  a reader in philosophy at the University of East Anglia where he was awarded – as Principal Investigator – Arts and Humanities Research Council (AHRC) funding for two projects on "natural capital". His other major recent academic focus has been on the precautionary principle, having contributed substantially to work co-authored with Nassim Nicholas Taleb on applying the principle to questions of genetic modification of organisms. In further work, Read has theorised the utility of the precautionary principle in a wide range of areas, including: climate change, the environment, as well as financial and technology sectors.

Read's application of the precautionary principle in climate and environmental affairs underlies many of his talks and presentations, notably including "Shed a Light – This civilisation is finished: so what is to be done?" which was given at Churchill College, Cambridge and has gained success on YouTube with over 200,000 views.

In June 2018, Read triggered a BBC policy shift by publicly refusing to debate with a climate change denier. This led to new policy that meant the BBC would no longer present climate change deniers' views as a counterbalance to scientific standpoints.

In October 2018, Read declared his support for Extinction Rebellion. Acting as Extinction Rebellion's spokesperson, he gave a number of interviews on national news programmes during the Rebellion's London protests in April 2019 (see below). Read was part of the five members of the group invited to meet with Environment Secretary Michael Gove to discuss their demands. The following day the UK Parliament declared a "climate change emergency"; part of Extinction Rebellion's demands.

Read commented regularly through the Eastern Daily Press "One World Column" for five years. In his regular appearances in the local and national press, he speaks on sustainable transport, green economics, and social justice. He was formerly chair of the Green House thinktank, a former Green Party spokesperson for transport and former East of England party co-ordinator.

Academic career

Read studied Philosophy, Politics and Economics (PPE) at Balliol College, Oxford, before undertaking postgraduate studies in the United States at Princeton University and Rutgers University (where he gained his doctorate). Influenced by Ludwig Wittgenstein's philosophy, his PhD involved "a Wittgensteinian exploration of the relationship between Kripke's 'quus' problem and Nelson Goodman's 'grue' problem."

He is a reader at the University of East Anglia, specialising in philosophy of language, philosophy of science, and environmental philosophy, previously having taught at Manchester. He has authored many books, including: Kuhn (2002), Applying Wittgenstein (2007), Philosophy for Life (2007), There is No Such Thing as a Social Science (2008), Wittgenstein Among the Sciences (2012), A Wittgensteinian Way with Paradoxes (2012), and A Film-Philosophy of Ecology and Enlightenment (2018). He has two chapters titled "Making the Best of Climate Disasters" and "Geoengineering as a Response to the Climate Crisis" in the Green House think-tank book: Facing up to Climate Reality (2019). His book 'This Civilisation Is Finished, co-authored by Samuel Alexander was published on 1 June 2019.

His editorial experience includes The New Hume Debate (co-edited, 2000), Film as Philosophy: Essays on Cinema after Wittgenstein and Cavell (2005), and the work for which he is perhaps best known, The New Wittgenstein (2000), which offers a major re-evaluation of Wittgenstein's thinking. He has also co-created other books including Debating Nature’s Value (2018).

Read was one of five contributors, including Nassim Nicholas Taleb, to a paper entitled "The Precautionary Principle (with Application to the Genetic Modification of Organisms)"; this paper has been downloaded approximately a quarter of a million times.

Read has been awarded – as principal investigator – AHRC funding for two projects on "natural capital". The first in 2016 titled "Debating Nature's Value" has completed with a book being published of the same name (see above). Read then lead on the follow-up project titled "Taking the debate on nature's value to the valuers".

Political career

Green Party 
Read was one of 13 Green Party councillors in Norwich, where he was first elected in 2004 to represent Wensum ward and re-elected in 2007 with 49% of the vote. He sat on the Joint Highways Committee of the city and county councils, and was spokesperson on Transport for the Green Party city councillors. Read stepped down from local politics in 2011 and Wensum was retained by the Green Party.

Having held a number of officer posts for the Eastern Region Green Party, at the beginning of 2007 Read was selected as Eastern Region Green Party's lead candidate for the European Parliament elections in 2009 and again in 2014. The East of England is one of the Green Party's stronger regions in terms of support, and under the proportional representation system on which the European elections operate, the party was optimistic that he would represent them in the European Parliament. However, he was beaten to the last of the seven seats in the constituency by the United Kingdom Independence Party (UKIP) in 2009, and similarly in 2014. For the 2019 European Elections, Read stood as the second ranked candidate on the Eastern Region list for the Green Party. He stood in the 2009 Norwich North by-election, as the Green Party candidate, and returned the biggest by-election vote share in Green history with 9.7% of the vote.

Read stood as MP candidate for Cambridge in the 2015 general election. He came fourth, having received 8% of the vote.

Read has also given many talks to Green Party organisations including the Ealing Green Party in March 2019.

In April 2019, Read became the second candidate on the Green Party list for the Eastern Region in the 2019 EU Elections and spent time in May campaigning with Caroline Lucas across the region. After the election, he became special adviser to Catherine Rowett during her time as an MEP: the first candidate on the Green Party list for the Eastern Region, who was elected an MEP.

School strike for climate 
Read was one of 224 academics to sign an open letter of support for the School strike for climate – a movement where children walked out of schools to protest at and demand action on climate change. In February 2019, Read joined school strikers at the Forum Library in Norwich and subsequently gained media coverage for his own personal open letter to schools in Norwich urging them to be supportive of action from students.

Extinction Rebellion
In October 2018 Read declared himself a supporter of Extinction Rebellion, an environmental direct action group, becoming a signatory of their first and second open letters to The Guardian and taking part in at least one of their November actions in London. A month later, Read took part in a sit-in to disrupt the consultation stage of a link between two major motorways across ecologically significant Wensum Valley in Norfolk.

In 2019, Read spoke to the Bath wing of Extinction Rebellion in a talk entitled "Your money or your life" which focused on biodiversity, pollution, and climate change before exploring practical options around responding to the climate and ecological 'emergencies'.

Read played a major role in the April 2019 Extinction Rebellion in London. In addition to joining and speaking to protesters across London, Read appeared on a number of news platforms as spokesman for Extinction Rebellion, putting forward their three demands not only to the New Scientist, but also to John Nicolson on talkRadio and Nick Ferrari on LBC; as well as debating Extinction Rebellion's approach and fracking's impact on climate change during Jacob Rees-Mogg’s LBC show; and explaining the Rebellion's approach to Doug Henwood’s KPFA radio show in the USA.

On television, Read appeared on Channel 5's 5 News in a performance described by Naomi Klein as "absolutely amazing", and BBC Politics Live where he notably successfully put pressure on Labour MP Jenny Chapman and Conservative minister Nadhim Zahawi to agree, live on TV, to meet Extinction Rebellion, and additionally demanded that politicians stop spreading the myth – and misleading statistics – that the UK is a leader on climate change action. More recently during the October 2019 Extinction Rebellion, Read appeared on BBC question time along with Secretary of State for Transport Grant Shapps MP, Lisa Nandy MP, businessman Theo Paphitis and journalist Julia Hartley-Brewer.

Through the work of their protests, Extinction Rebellion were invited to talk to the Mayor of London Sadiq Khan and Shadow Chancellor John McDonnell. Additionally, Read was personally involved in meeting Environment Secretary Michael Gove at DEFRA where he put forward Extinction Rebellion's demands and concerns directly to the government.

A day later the UK Parliament became the first in the world to declare a "climate change emergency"; part of the first one of Extinction Rebellion's three demands.

In 2020, Read orchestrated the leak of the JP Morgan report saying Earth is on unsustainable trajectory, in which the major fossil fuel financier warned its clients of the economic risks of man-made global warming.

In July 2020, Read published a collection of essays entitled Extinction Rebellion: Insights from the Inside about his experiences of being involved in Extinction Rebellion from its inception in 2018 up until the Covid pandemic. This piece was edited by, and contains a postscript from, Samuel Alexander.  

Read is no longer a spokesperson for Extinction Rebellion, as he refuses to speak to any Murdoch-owned outlets "until climate change is front page news," and he felt that this stance would weaken his ability to be an efficient spokesperson for the activist organisation going forward.

Moderate Flank
Read is now involved in creating a 'moderate flank' of climate activism, arguing that whilst Extinction Rebellion has been extremely successful in elevating climate change as a political and social issue, some of its tactics risk isolating people. On an issue as crucial as climate change, Read believes that all people must have an outlet to express their concerns and pressurise for political change, which requires the formation of a less radical wing of the climate movement. Another central part of the moderate flank is to avoid stances on identity politics in an attempt to maximise participation from all sides of the political spectrum.
Read is currently co-director of the Moderate Flank Incubator designed to help grow the moderate flank, which has initial core funding of £100,000.

Political journalism
Read was a regular contributor to the One World Column in the EDP, focusing on international development, poverty, globalisation, peacemaking, human rights, international relations and the environment. He has also had various articles appear in The Independent, The Guardian, and The Conversation.

Leave Our Kids Alone 
Read is co-founder of the Leave our Kids Alone campaign, which seeks a ban on all advertising targeting children under 11.

Guardians for future generations 
Read has developed, on the basis of his research in political and environmental philosophy, a radical proposal for institutional reform, to provide a place in the UK's democratic system for a voice for future people. The proposal was launched at Parliament on 10 January 2012.

Works 
 (Co-authored with James L. Guetti)  Meaningful Consequences, The Philosophical Forum, Volume XXX, Issue 4, December 1999, Pages 289–315.
 (Edited with Alice Crary) The New Wittgenstein, London: Routledge, 2000.
 (Co-authored with Wes Sharrock) Kuhn: Philosopher of Scientific Revolution, Oxford: Polity, (2002).
 (Co-edited with Jerry Goodenough) Film as Philosophy: Essays in Cinema after Wittgenstein and Cavell (2005).
 Philosophy for Life: Applying Philosophy in Politics and Culture (2007).
 (Co-authored with Matthew A. Lavery) 'Beyond the Tractatus Wars: The New Wittgenstein Debate' (2011) 
 'A Wittgensteinian Way with Paradoxes' (2012)
 Nassim Nicholas Taleb, Rupert Read, Raphael Douady, Joseph Norman, Yaneer Bar-Yam. The Precautionary Principle (With Application to the Genetic Modification of Organisms), (2014).
 "The Tale Parfit Tells: Analytic Metaphysics of Personal Identity vs. Wittgensteinian Film and Literature," in Philosophy and Literature 39.1 (April 2015): 128–53.
 'A Film-Philosophy of Ecology and Environment' (2018)
 (Co-authored with Samuel Alexander) 'This Civilisation Is Finished' (2019)
 (Co-authored with Samuel Alexander) 'Extinction Rebellion: Insights From The Inside' (2020)
 'Wittgenstein's Liberatory Philosophy: Thinking Through His Philosophical Investigations' (2020)
 'Parents For A Future: how loving our children can prevent climate collapse' (2021)
 (Co-edited with Ian Sinclair) 'A Timeline of the Plague Year: A Comprehensive Record of the UK Government's Response to the Coronavirus Crisis' (2021)
 (Co-edited with Jem Bendell) 'Deep Adaptation: Navigating the Realities of Climate Chaos' (2021)
 'Why Climate Breakdown Matters' (2022)
 'Do You Want To Know The Truth' (2022)

References

External links

Website

Living people
Alumni of Balliol College, Oxford
Princeton University alumni
Rutgers University alumni
Academics of the University of East Anglia
British philosophers
Councillors in Norfolk
Green Party of England and Wales parliamentary candidates
Philosophers of science
Extinction Rebellion
1966 births
Sustainable transport pioneers